UTT could refer to:

People
 Adelbert L. Utt (1856-1936), American politician
 James B. Utt (1899-1970), American politician
 Utt Panichkul, Thai-American actor, host and model

Others
 K. D. Matanzima Airport, Umtata, South Africa, IATA code
 United Talmud Torahs of Montreal
 University of Technology of Troyes, France
 University of Trinidad and Tobago
 Uttoxeter railway station, England, National Rail station code
 Untritrium, hypothetical chemical element 133
 Unconscious Thought Theory
 Unified Targeting Tool, a database query tool used by NSA